Kimadanda is a market center in Sandhikharka Municipality of Arghakhanchi District in the Lumbini Zone of Western Nepal. The former village development committee (VDC) was converted into municipality on 18 May 2014 by merging the existing Sandhikharka, Bangla, Narapani, Khanchikot, Kimadada, Argha and Dibharna VDCs. At the time of the 1991 Nepal census, the town had a population of 5,430 living in 1,085 houses. At the time of the 2001 Nepal census, the population was 3,514, of which 53% was literate.

References

Populated places in Arghakhanchi District